The MAS-38 is a French submachine gun designed in the 1930s and used by French and German forces during the Second World War. It was derived from a small arms development program that took place between 1918 and 1922 under the control of the Service Technique de l'Armement. A submachine gun, a light machine gun and a semiautomatic rifle were developed to replace all the existing small arms. Budgetary pressures resulting from the building of the Maginot Line led to the delay of adoption of these new arms except for the LMG 1924.

History

The Pistolet Mitrailleur MAS modèle 38 (MAS Model 38 Submachine Gun) was developed from the experimental MAS-35, itself derived from the STA 1922 and the MAS 1924 both in 9 mm produced immediately after World War I. Prior to the development of this weapon France used a variety of German and Swiss submachine guns.

MAS, the Manufacture d'Armes de Saint-Étienne (Weapons Industry of Saint-Étienne), was a French supplier of arms that manufactured several firearms for the French military, including the MAS-36 rifle, the MAS-49 rifle, and the FAMAS. It is now part of Nexter. The French Ministry of War said it had no need for a submachine gun and mass-production did not begin until 1939.

The German army seized the MAS plant in 1940 just as the MAS-38 was entering large-scale production. The Germans accepted the gun as a substitute standard weapon, naming it the 7.65 mm MP722(f). They continued production of the gun for their own armed forces and supplied some to the Vichy French.

On April 28, 1945, one was used by Italian partisans to execute the former Fascist leader Benito Mussolini.

Production ended in 1949. By that time 1,958 were manufactured before German occupation, and further production is unknown. The French police continued to use the MAS-38 after World War II until it was replaced in the 1950s by the MAT-49 submachine gun.

Design details

The MAS-38 is 623mm (24.53 in) long with a 224 mm (8.82 in) barrel; it weighs 2.87 kg (6.33 lb) empty. It uses a 32-round box magazine. The muzzle velocity is 350 m/s (1,148 ft/s) and it has a rate of fire of 600 to 700 rounds per minute.

The MAS-38 was chambered for the 7.65mm Longue cartridge, which although similar to the .30 Pedersen cartridge is not an exact copy. The 7.65 French Longue cartridge is nearly identical to its predecessor used by the Pedersen device, but with slight differences in the groove of the shell. This was also the cartridge used for France's M1935 series of service pistols, allowing for limited standardization, but with the effect of preventing French soldiers from using captured enemy ammunition.

The MAS-38 is easily recognizable due to its unorthodox receiver layout. This is because the receiver and butt diverge in alignment from the axis of the barrel by several degrees, making the weapon compact as its bolt recoils inside a tube running through the buttstock, while also enabling a lighter bolt to be used by providing mechanical disadvantage to the pressure from the expanding propellant gases. To allow a natural aiming stance, the butt had to drop while the receiver had to remain in alignment. This required that the bolt approach the breech at an angle and the face of the bolt was cut obliquely to allow it to close evenly on the cartridge. The MAS-38 also features an unusual safety catch: the bolt was locked (in either the forward or rear position) by pushing the trigger forward. A valuable feature was that tools were not required for its disassembly.

A very high quality weapon, the MAS-38 was machined from solid steel with only a few stamped parts. It was designed with a buffered sear assembly to prevent wear and increase the life of the internal parts. A dual range sight system was concealed within the receiver so as to be out of sight until it was flipped up for use.

The odd appearance of the MAS-38 did not detract from its accuracy, but its cartridge was underpowered compared to the German 9mm standard pistol ammunition.

Users
 
 Central African Republic Police had 30 MAS-38s in 1963
: French armed forces
 French Resistance and Free French Forces

 

 Viet Minh

References

External links 
 French SE MAS 1935 submachine-gun (catalog no. FIR 6058) at Imperial War Museums
 The French MAS-38 Submachine Gun

.32 ACP submachine guns 
.32 Longue firearms
Submachine guns of France
World War II submachine guns
World War II infantry weapons of France
World War II infantry weapons of Germany
Weapons and ammunition introduced in 1939
Off-axis bolt travel blowback firearms